El Marg (  ) is a district in the Eastern Area of Cairo, Egypt, bordering Qalyubia Governorate near Shubra El Kheima.  It was separated from the El Salam district (to its south) on 1 April 1994.  Its residential area is densely populated.  It covers 16.94 square kilometers, with 251,589 people according to a 1996 census, increasing to 507,035 in 2006. In 2017 El-Marg had 798,646 residents making it the most populous district in Cairo.

El Marg was a royal property belonging to the Burji dynasty of the Mamluk Sultanate.

Administrative subdivisions and population
El-Marg is subdivided into seven shiakhas.
In 2017, el-Marg had 798,646 residents across its seven shiakhas.

References

1994 establishments in Egypt
Districts of Cairo
Populated places established in 1994